The Church of Saint George, Sopotnica is a Serbian Orthodox church located at the village of Sopotnica in the Municipality of Novo Goražde in eastern Republika Srpska, Bosnia and Herzegovina. The church stands at the left bank of the Drina River, 4 kilometres from the town of Goražde. It was built in 1454 by Stjepan Vukčić Kosača, when Goražde was part of a region ruled by him. The region would later come to be known as Herzegovina, after Kosača's title Herceg of Saint Sava. Herzegovina was gradually conquered by the Ottoman Empire between 1465 and 1481.

In the second half of the 16th century, during the office of Serbian Patriarch Makarije Sokolović, the church was enlarged on its western side. It was repaired in 1869, when a metal door was installed at its entrance, which was donated by a Serb from Sarajevo. Remains of its old frescoes were then carefully collected and buried beside the church's wall. A bell tower was added at the church's western side in 1894. At the beginning of the Bosnian War, the church was shelled and set on fire in September 1992. It remained roofless until October 1994, when a temporary roof was installed. The church was restored between 2000 and 2002, and in 2008, it was designated as a National Monument of Bosnia and Herzegovina.

In 1519, at the beginning of the Ottoman rule over Herzegovina, one of the earliest printing houses among the Serbs was established at the church. Known as the Goražde printing house, it was the first such facility in the territory of present-day Bosnia and Herzegovina. It produced three books: a hieratikon (priest's service book) in 1519, a psalter in 1521, and a small euchologion in 1523.

Notes

References

Serbian Orthodox church buildings in Bosnia and Herzegovina
National Monuments of Bosnia and Herzegovina
Destroyed churches
Rebuilt churches in Bosnia and Herzegovina
15th-century Serbian Orthodox church buildings
History of Herzegovina
Novo Goražde
Buildings and structures in Republika Srpska
Attacks on religious buildings and structures during the Bosnian War